Albone may refer to:

 Albone Glacier, glacier
 Albone (surname), an Italian surname